Galium stellatum (starry bedstraw or desert bedstraw) is a species of plant in the family Rubiaceae. It is widespread across most of Arizona, and found also in Baja California, Baja California Sur, southeastern California (Inyo, San Bernardino, Riverside, Imperial and San Diego Counties),  Nevada (Clark, Nye and Lincoln Cos.), Utah (Washington County). It is dioecious, with male and female flowers on separate plants.

References

External links
Calflora taxon report
Desert Ecology of Tucson, Pima Community College, desert bedstraw
Calphotos, University of California at Berkeley
Tom Chester, Borrego Desert Plants: desert bedstraw, Galium stellatum ssp. eremicum

stellatum
Flora of Baja California
Flora of Baja California Sur
Flora of California
Flora of Arizona
Flora of Utah
Flora of Nevada
Plants described in 1863
Dioecious plants
Flora without expected TNC conservation status